Foggaret el Arab is a village in the commune of Foggaret Ezzaouia, in In Salah District, Tamanrasset Province, Algeria.

References

Neighbouring towns and cities

Populated places in Tamanrasset Province